Flexer is a surname. Notable people with the surname include:

 Joe Flexer (1933–2000), trade unionist and communist activist in Canada
 Mae Flexer (in office from 2009), American politician

See also
 E-Flexer-class ferry
 Flexor